WLCR (1040 AM) is a radio station broadcasting a Catholic radio format. It is licensed to Mount Washington, Kentucky, United States, and serves the Louisville area.  The station is owned by LCR Partners, L.P.

History
The station began broadcasting as WSAC on October 29, 1955, licensed to Radcliff and moved in 1958 to Fort Knox at 1470 AM. The station first aired a Top 40 format. It changed its call sign to WBUL on August 20, 1984, and became an adult contemporary station. WBUL is a former Louisville market affiliate for Rick Dees Weekly Top 40, which is unusual in an adult contemporary station. This lasted for a short time until WDJX began broadcasting and began carrying the program. On May 26, 1999, the station changed its call sign to the current WLCR.

History of call letters
The call letters WLCR used to be assigned to an AM station in Torrington, Connecticut. It began broadcasting January 1, 1948, on 990 kHz with 1 kW power.

References

External links

LCR
Radio stations established in 1955
1955 establishments in Kentucky
LCR
Christian radio stations in Kentucky
Catholic radio stations